CKHJ is a radio station in Fredericton, New Brunswick, Canada, broadcasting at 1260 AM. The station broadcasts a country format under the Pure Country branding. The station is owned by Bell Media which also owns sister stations CFXY-FM and CIBX-FM. There are two rebroadcasters of CKHJ on FM due to the AM station's weak signal to the south and east of the city: CKHJ-1-FM on 95.1 in New Maryland, and CKHJ-2-FM in 103.5 in Oromocto. All three transmitters can be heard over most of Fredericton, effectively creating a simulcast. CKHJ uses on the air-branding of Pure Country 103.5 (a name adopted on May 28, 2019, as part of a country-wide format reorganization by Bell that also involved CKTY-FM and 11 other stations), referencing the frequency of CKHJ-2-FM, which is a rimshot signal.

Based on the current format, CKHJ competes with Stingray-owned CFRK-FM.

History  

The station at 1260 AM first signed on August 19, 1977 as CIHI. In June 2000, the station swapped frequencies with what was then CKHJ-FM, with CIHI assuming CKHJ's 105.3 frequency and CKHJ moving to 1260 AM. CIHI-FM would subsequently become CFXY-FM.

CKHJ, along with CIHI, was owned by Radio One Ltd. from its creation until 1999, when they were sold to Telemedia Communications. Telemedia then sold the stations to Astral Media in 2002. Current owners Bell Media acquired the stations from Astral Media in 2013.

The station's transmitter is on Royal Road, northwest of Fredericton.

On November 27, 2008, CKHJ applied to increase the signal of CKHJ-2-FM Oromocto. The station received approval on January 26, 2009.

On August 20, 2020, Bell Media submitted an application to reduce CKHJ's nighttime AM signal from 10,000 watts to 32 watts, while the daytime power would remain at 10,000 watts. CKHJ will remain at 1260 kHz. This application was approved on October 29, 2020.

Rebroadcasters

References

External links
Pure Country 103.5
 

Khj
Khj
Khj
Radio stations established in 1977
1977 establishments in New Brunswick